Stiepel Priory is a Cistercian monastery in Stiepel in Bochum, North Rhine-Westphalia, Germany.

It was founded in 1988 at the instigation of Franz Hengsbach, first Bishop of the Diocese of the Ruhr. It is a dependent house of Heiligenkreuz Abbey in Austria.

The priory church is also a place of pilgrimage to the Blessed Virgin Mary, which is taken care of by the monks and the local parish.

Priors and Subpriors

External links

  Stiepel Priory website

Cistercian monasteries in Germany
Monasteries in North Rhine-Westphalia
Christian organizations established in 1988
Buildings and structures in Bochum